Ten Thousand is a 40-story residential skyscraper located at 10000 Santa Monica Boulevard, Los Angeles, California. The high-rise tower, built by developer Crescent Heights, has 283 luxury apartments and rises 483 feet. The complex is on the list of the Tallest Buildings in Los Angeles County of The Los Angeles Almanac. Ten Thousand was designed by Handel Architects.

History
Prior to Ten Thousand, the 2.4-acre lot was occupied by an office building built in 1970, and the site was once home to Jimmy's restaurant, a popular hangout for celebrities and local politicians. After demolition in the early 2000s, the site was considered highly valuable and was contested by many developers including Donald Trump. The auction was won by SunCal Cos of Irvine but the company filed for bankruptcy in 2008. Eventually, the site was bought for $59 million by Crescent Heights in late 2010. The project was financed by Bank of China which lent $390 million in mortgage financing to Crescent Heights. Construction started in 2014 and completed in 2016. Ten Thousand opened for lease in 2017. In March 2018, Ten Thousand was certified LEED Gold by the U.S. Green Building Council.

Design and location
The building exterior, designed by San Francisco architecture firm Handel Architects, is made from metal panel, stone and glass. The structural engineer was Magnusson Klemencic Associates. The interiors and landscape were designed by Shamir Shah Design and RELM Studio. The high-rise is located between Century City neighborhood and Beverly Hills, in walking distance from Rodeo Drive and Westfield Century City Amenities include a one-acre park, two pools, a tennis and basketball court, fitness center, resident lounge, private theater, robot butler and elements of Smart Home technology.

See also
List of tallest buildings in Los Angeles

References

Buildings and structures in Santa Monica, California

Skyscrapers in California

Residential skyscrapers in Los Angeles

Residential buildings completed in 2017